The Kyuyonelekeen (Küönelekeen), also spelled as Kyuyonelekyan and Kyuenelekyan, is a river in Yakutia (Sakha Republic) and Krasnoyarsk Krai, Russia.

The river and its tributaries flow across uninhabited areas. The nearest settlement is Olenyok village, Olenyoksky District, located to the east of its mouth.

Course  
The Kyuyonelekeen is a left tributary of the Arga-Sala. Its sources are in the southern end of the Anabar Plateau, Central Siberian Plateau, south of the basin of the Bolshaya Kuonamka, part of the Anabar basin. The river flows roughly southwards across mountainous taiga, to the west of the Kengeede. In mid course it turns eastwards and, after a stretch, southeastwards. Finally it joins the left bank of the Arga-Sala river  from its mouth in the Olenyok. 

The river is frozen between the first half of October and late May or early June.

Tributaries 

See also
List of rivers of Russia

References

External links 
Fishing & Tourism in Yakutia

Rivers of the Sakha Republic
Tributaries of the Arga-Sala
Central Siberian Plateau